Hernán Pablo Garín (born 24 October 1983) is an Italian Argentine footballer who plays for club FCD Moconesi Fontanabuona '92.

Biography
In 2007, he left for Italian amateur side Corridonia. In 2008, he left for Città di Castello. That season there were 3 teams from that town to compete in Eccellenza Umbria and Garin's AC Città di Castello finished as a mid-table team.

In August 2009 he was signed by Serie D team Savona. He scored 8 league goals for the Serie D Group A champion.

On 11 January 2012, he joined Virtus Entella.

From 2020/2021 Season he joined Andrea Doria Calcio, an amatorial club in Aics Liguria League

Honours
Serie D: 2010 (Savona)

References

External links
 Hernán Garín at BDFA.com.ar 
 
 LaSerieD.com Profile 

Argentine footballers
Argentine expatriate footballers
Savona F.B.C. players
A.C. Cuneo 1905 players
Expatriate footballers in Italy
People with acquired Italian citizenship
Argentine emigrants to Italy
Sportspeople from Entre Ríos Province
1983 births
Living people
Association football midfielders